The Serbs have many traditions. The Slava is an exclusive custom of the Serbs, each family has one patron saint that they venerate on their feast day. The Serbian Orthodox Church uses the traditional Julian Calendar, as per which Christmas Day (December 25) falls currently on January 7 of the Gregorian Calendar, thus the Serbs celebrate Christmas on January 7, shared with the Orthodox churches of Jerusalem, Russia, Georgia, Ukraine and the Greek Old Calendarists.

Hospitality
Traditionally, honored guests in a Serbian home are greeted with bread and salt and/or a spoonful of Slatko. Furthermore, it is common for guests to bring something sweet to the host when going on a visit, even if they're only stopping by for a short time.

Art

Music

Folklor

Serbian epic poetry

Christian

Slava

Slava, also called krsna slava and krsno ime ("christened name"), is the Serbian Orthodox tradition of the veneration and observance of the family's patron saint. All Serbs celebrate Slava, every family has their own patron saint that they celebrate on the feast day. It is of pre-Christian origin.

The most common feast days are St. Nicholas (falling on December 19), St. George (May 6, see Đurđevdan), St. John the Baptist (January 20), Saint Demetrius (November 8) and St. Michael (November 21). Given dates are by official Gregorian calendar. Serbian Orthodox Church uses Julian calendar that is late 13 days. For example, St. Nicholas date is December 6, but by Julian calendar this date is 13 days later, when by Gregorian calendar is December 19.

Vidovdan

Vidovdan (28 June) is sacred to ethnic Serbs (Serbian Orthodox Christians) and the cult was especially active among the South Slavs, who had transformed the pagan Slavic god Svetovid into the Sicilian martyr who exorcized the evil out of Diocletian's son.
Through the centuries, Serbian historical events such as the defeat at the Battle of Kosovo became sources for spiritual strength and patriotism. It was not a coincidence that Gavrilo Princip assassinates the Austro-Hungarian Archduke Franz Ferdinand at Vidovdan, triggering the First World War.

Vidovdan has long been considered a date of special importance to ethnic Serbs and the Balkans, the following events each took place on Vidovdan, but are expressed here in the Gregorian Calendar:
 on June 28, 1389, the Ottoman Empire fought against Serbia in the Battle of Kosovo, and Serbian Prince Lazar was slain in battle. Ottoman Sultan Murad I was killed by Serbian knight Miloš Obilić.
 on June 28, 1914, the assassination of the Austro-Hungarian crown prince, Franz Ferdinand, triggers the First World War.
 on June 28, 1919, the Treaty of Versailles was signed, ending World War I.
 on June 28, 1921, the Serbian King Alexander I proclaimed the new Constitution of the Kingdom of Serbs, Croats and Slovenes, known thereafter as the Vidovdan Constitution.
 on June 28, 1948, the Cominform published, on the initiative of its Soviet delegates Zhdanov, Malenkov and Suslov, in a "Resolution on the State of the Communist Party of Yugoslavia" their condemnation of the Yugoslavian communist leaders – this happening is seen as the date that marks the final split between the Soviet Union and Yugoslavia.
 on June 28, 1989, on the 600th anniversary of the battle of Kosovo, Serbian leader Slobodan Milošević delivered the Gazimestan speech at the site of the historic battle.
 on June 28, 2001, Slobodan Milošević was deported to ICTY to stand trial.
 on June 28, 2006, Montenegro was announced as the 192nd member state of the United Nations.
 on June 28, 2008, was the inaugural meeting of the Community Assembly of Kosovo and Metohija.

Christmas traditions

The Serbs celebrate Christmas – diminutive form of the word bog, meaning 'god', it refers to Jesus seeing as he is the son of god) for three consecutive days, beginning with Christmas Day. The Serbian Orthodox Church uses the traditional Julian Calendar, as per which Christmas Day (December 25) falls currently on January 7 of the Gregorian Calendar. This day is called by Serbs the first day of Christmas, and the following two are accordingly called the second, and the third day of Christmas. During this festive time, one is to greet another person with "Christ is Born," which should be responded to with "Truly He is Born."

This holiday surpasses all the other celebrated by Serbs, with respect to the diversity of applied folk customs and rituals. These may vary from region to region, some of them having modern versions adapted to the contemporary way of living. The ideal environment to carry them out fully is the traditional multi-generation country household. In the morning of Christmas Eve a Serbian Badnjak Oak (sacred tree) is felled, and a log cut from it is in the evening ceremoniously put on the domestic fire. A bundle of straw is taken into the house and spread over the floor. The dinner on this day is festive, copious and diverse in foods, although it is prepared in accordance with the rules of fasting. Groups of young people go from house to house of their village or neighborhood, congratulating the holiday, singing, and making performances; this continues through the next three days.

On Christmas Day, the celebration is announced at dawn by church bells and by shooting. A big importance is given to the first visit a family receives that day. People expect that it will summon prosperity and well-being for their household in the ensuing year; this visit is often pre-arranged. Christmas dinner is the most celebratory meal a family has during a year. A special, festive loaf of bread is baked for this occasion. The main course is roast pork which they cook whole by rotating it impaled on a wooden spit close to an open fire. It is not a part of Serbian traditions to exchange gifts during Christmas. Gift giving is, nevertheless, connected with the holiday, being traditionally done on the three consecutive Sundays that immediately precede it. Children, women, and men, respectively, are the set gift-givers on these three days. Closely related to Christmas is New Year's Day by the Julian calendar (January 14 on the Gregorian calendar), whose traditional folk name is Little Christmas.

Badnjak
Pečenica
Koleda, a custom of a group of young men, masked and costumed, goes from house to house of their village singing special koleda songs and performing acts of magic to summon health, wealth, and prosperity for each household. The members of the group are called koledari. The koleda is carried out from the Feast of Saint Ignatius Theophorus (five days before Christmas) up until the Epiphany.

Vertep

Easter
The archaic term for Easter is Veligdan (from Velikdan,  "Great Day") while Vaskrs/Uskrs is officially in use. In these times people greet each other with the terms "Hristos vaskrse" ("Christ is Risen") and the reply "Vaistinu vaskrse" ("Truly He is Risen").

Egg tapping
Egg decoration (Pisanke)

Lazarus Saturday

Vrbica or Lazarus Saturday, is a Serbian Orthodox tradition that has origins in the Eastern Christian feast of Lazarus Saturday, however the feast has its own features. The feast celebrates the resurrection of Lazarus of Bethany, the narrative of which is found in the New Testament Gospel of John.

The feast is also to commemorate Tsar Lazar, a national symbol and the King of Serbia who fought and died at the historical Battle of Kosovo in 1389 against the invading Ottoman Turkey. It is believed that Lazar led the procession and since the ritual (Lazarice) is held every year at his name day.

Burning a fire against vermin and snakes
Picking flowers and herbs which are put in water to either drink or swim in
Lazarice ritual, a procession, parade of six maids

Zapis

A zapis ("inscription") is a tree in Serbia that is sacred for the village within whose bounds it is situated. A cross is inscribed into the bark of each zapis. Most of these trees are large oaks. Prayers are offered to God under the crown of the zapis, where also church services may be held, especially on village festivals observed to supplicate God for protection against destructive weather conditions. In settlements without a church, ceremonies such as weddings and baptisms used to be conducted under the tree. Folk tradition maintains that great misfortune will happen to anyone who dares to fell a zapis. According to Serbian scholar Veselin Čajkanović, the zapis is inherited from the pre-Christian religion of the Serbs, in which it had been used as a temple.

References

 
Serbian culture